Hackensall Hall, also known as Hackensall Hall Farmhouse, is an historic building on Whinny Lane in Preesall, Lancashire, England. It is Grade II listed, built in 1873.

A remodelling of a 17th-century house, it retains much of its earlier fabric.  It is in pebbledashed brick with sandstone dressings and a slate roof, and has two storeys with attics.  The house has an irregular plan with rear wings and outshuts.  Most of the windows are mullioned and transomed, or mullioned.  Other features include a single-storey gabled porch, a doorway with a moulded surround and a Tudor arched head, and a re-set inscribed plaque.  Inside the house is an inglenook.

Francis Fleetwood, brother of Richard, built Hackensall Hall in 1656 after their home at Rossall Hall was flooded. Nearby Parrox Hall was built about the same time, and has been in the possession of the Elletson family since 1690.

Dorothy Parkinson

Dorothy Parkinson, who created the first example of Preesall salt, lived at the farm up until her death in 1925. She raised nine children there.

In 1926, Parkinson's husband, John, found over three hundred Roman coins in the hall's grounds. They were estimated to date to around 273 AD.

Architectural detail

Farm buildings

See also
Listed buildings in Preesall

References

Sources

1873 establishments in England
Houses completed in 1873
Grade II listed buildings in Lancashire
Houses in Lancashire
Farmhouses in England
Buildings and structures in the Borough of Wyre